The 2022 Big Easy Tour, titled as the 2022 Altron Big Easy Tour for sponsorship reasons, was the 11th season of the Big Easy Tour and the fourth in which events received Official World Golf Ranking points.

Schedule
The following table lists official events during the 2022 season.

Order of Merit
The Order of Merit was based on prize money won during the season, calculated in South African rand. The top 10 players on the tour earned status to play on the 2023–24 Sunshine Tour.

Notes

References

2022 in golf
2022 in South African sport